Brittanichthys is a genus of characins endemic to the Rio Negro basin in South America.  The currently described species are:
 Brittanichthys axelrodi Géry, 1965
 Brittanichthys myersi Géry, 1965

Etymology
The genus Brittanichthys is named in honor of ichthyologist Martin Ralph Brittan (1922-2008), Sacramento State College, California, who discovered both species.

The species Brittanichthys axelrodi is named in honor of pet-book publisher Herbert R. Axelrod (1927-2017), whose T.F.H. Fund sponsored the expedition that collected the type specimen.

The species Brittanichthys myersi is named in honor of Stanford University ichthyologist George S. Myers (1905-1985), “a long-time student of South American fishes”

References
 

Characidae
Taxa named by Jacques Géry
Fish of South America
Fish of Brazil